Våler is a municipality in Innlandet county, Norway. It is located in the traditional district of Solør. The administrative centre of the municipality is the village of Våler. Other villages in Våler include Braskereidfoss, Gravberget, and Risberget.

The  municipality is the 164th largest by area out of the 356 municipalities in Norway. Våler is the 213th most populous municipality in Norway with a population of 3,597.

General information

The area of Våler was originally part of the municipality of Hof that was established on 1 January 1838 (see formannskapsdistrikt law). This new municipality was made up of three areas: Hof, Aasnes, and Våler. In 1849, the municipality of Hof was divided in two: Hof (population: 2,913) and Åsnes og Våler (population: 7,087). In 1854, the relatively new municipality of Åsnes og Våler was divided into Åsnes (population: 3,677) and Våler (population: 3,410). This division happened after a hard struggle, mainly led by Christian Halvorsen Svenkerud, a local member of parliament.

Name
The municipality (originally the parish) is named after the old  farm, since the first Våler Church was built on that site.

Coat of arms
The coat of arms was granted on 7 August 1987. The arms show a gold-colored winged arrow pointing down on a red background. The arms are based on the legend that in 1022, King Olaf II of Norway (Saint Olaf) shot an arrow and where the arrow hit the ground, he built the church.

Churches

The Church of Norway has two parishes within the municipality of Våler. It is part of the Solør, Vinger og Odal prosti (deanery) in the Diocese of Hamar.

The first Våler Church was known as the Mariakirken. Legend says the church was established by Saint Olaf. The church was rebuilt several times. By 1686, the stave church that was standing at that time was in poor condition so it was renovated and restored. In 1804, the people of Våler asked the King permission to build a new church. It was permitted by the King, and so the construction of a new church started the same year. The church tower is dated 1805, and the dedication of the new church was 26 June 1806. The old stave church was then torn down. Today, there is a monument where the old church stood. On 29 May 2009 the Våler Church was destroyed by an arson attack, which is suspected to be an act of satanist. It was rebuilt in 2015.

Geography
The municipality is bordered in the north by the municipality of Elverum, in the east by the municipality of Trysil and the neighboring country of Sweden, in the south by the municipality of Åsnes, and in the west by the municipality of Stange.

The municipality lies in the north end of the traditional district of Solør, and it is often referred to as Våler in Solør. Solør is the geographical area that lies between the towns of Elverum and Kongsvinger. The eastern part of Solør (in the area bordering Sweden) is known as Finnskogen (the forest of the "Finns").

Agriculture and forestry are the main industries in Våler. With near 90% of the total area covered with forest, Våler is among the larger forested municipalities in Norway. Most of the agricultural areas are found near the river Glomma. The Solør Line runs through the municipality on the east bank of the river. The river Flisa also runs through the municipality.

Government
All municipalities in Norway, including Våler, are responsible for primary education (through 10th grade), outpatient health services, senior citizen services, unemployment and other social services, zoning, economic development, and municipal roads. The municipality is governed by a municipal council of elected representatives, which in turn elects a mayor.  The municipality falls under the Østre Innlandet District Court and the Eidsivating Court of Appeal.

Municipal council
The municipal council  of Våler is made up of 19 representatives that are elected to four year terms. The party breakdown of the council is as follows:

Mayor
The mayors of Våler (incomplete list):
2003-2015: Kjell Konterud (Ap)
2015-2019: Lise Berger Svenkerud (H)
2019–present: Ola Cato Lie (Sp)

History

Stone age
It is not known for certain when the first humans arrived in Våler, but it is thought to be at the end of the neolithic era (4000–1800 BC). Tools made of flint have been found that are dated to about 2000 BC. Flint is not natural to the area, indicating it came along trade routes from the south.

The first humans in the deep forests of Våler lived mainly by hunting and fishing. Even though the people around the nearby lake Mjøsa already kept livestock and grew crops, some time passed before the people in Våler settled as farmers.

Pre-Christian times
From about 1000 BC there are findings that indicate settlements in Våler. In the Viking Age, from about 700–1000 AD, Våler became more than just a few settled farms. At one stage in history, Solør was a powerful petty kingdom.

The name Våler comes from the Old Norse word , which means “trunks, or stumps (roots) from burnt trees in a clearing.” Names which are variations of vål are common in Norway as the first stage of clearing woodland for cultivation was to burn the trees and undergrowth.

The conversion of Hedemark to Christianity is mentioned in the book Heimskringla (The Chronicle of the Kings of Norway) by Snorri Sturluson. According to legend, King Olaf II of Norway (Saint Olaf) went to Våler to convert the heathens to Christianity in 1022 AD. At first there was some resistance, but resistance proved to be futile. The farmers were quickly convinced to convert to Christianity, as in many other areas of Norway. The king decided that they had to build a church, but the locals couldn't agree where to place it. So the king settled the matter in a simple and efficient way. He took his bow, and shot an arrow up in the air and declared that wherever the arrow landed, the church was to be built. The arrow landed in a vål at the banks of the river Glomma. This incident gave name to both the place and the church. (Although later the church was called Mariakirken, which translates to Church of Mary). Våler Municipality's coat of arms illustrates Saint Olaf's arrow.

Medieval period
During the Middle Ages, Våler was just an outpost far from the main travel route. Those few who went through, were either wanderers or pilgrims heading for Saint Olaf's tomb in Nidaros (later Trondheim). One pilgrim's route for Swedish pilgrims lay through Eidskog, Solør, and Elverum; Adam of Bremen mentions this route as early as 1070. Along this route, the pilgrims often stopped at the spring at Våler, where legend had it that Saint Olaf had watered his horse; the water was supposed to possess wonderful curative properties.

The Black Death spread through Norway between 1348 and 1350. We do not know how hard Våler was affected by the plague, but a legend tells that only one boy and one girl survived.

By the 17th century, there was quite a lot of livestock in Våler. As the technology improved, the forestry became more and more important in the forests along the many rivers and lakes in the area.

Finnish immigration
An important part of Våler's and Solør's history, is the immigration and settlement of people from Finland. From the late 16th century they were encouraged by Swedish king Gustav Vasa to settle in the unpopulated areas of Värmland and Solør, along the border between Norway and Sweden. At that time the forests far from the settled areas of the two countries were of little value, and therefore immigrants could settle in large numbers without coming into conflict with the locals. The Finnish immigration was a result of hunger and turbulent times in Finland. King Gustav Vasa welcomed the immigrants, because he wanted to increase the taxable income from the scarcely populated areas of western Sweden.

The Finns brought with them their unique culture and their way of life. Amongst other things, they imported the agricultural technique, common in Finland and Eastern Sweden, known as svedjebruk or slash-burn agriculture. This involved setting fire to the forest and growing crops on the fertile ash-covered soil. The clearing was initially planted to rye, and then in the second and third year with turnips or cabbages. It then might be grazed for several years before being allowed to return to woodland. In this manner, they periodically moved around and burned down new areas and left their former areas to regrow with forest.

The Finnish language, still has an influence in the area. Many place names and words and expressions in the local dialects derive from the Finnish. The area itself is called Finnskogen, which translates as "The Finnish forest".

Notable people 
 Bernt Lund (1812 in Våler, Hedmark – 1885) a Norwegian landscape artist, author and military officer
 Hermann Hansen Aarsrud (1837 in Våler, Hedmark – 1927) a farmer, politician and Mayor of Våler 1879 to 1904
 Halvdan Aarsrud (1878 in Våler, Hedmark – 1925) a bailiff, politician and Mayor of Våler during WWI
 Jo Inge Bjørnebye (1946 in Våler, Hedmark – 2013) a Norwegian ski jumper, competed at the 1968 Winter Olympics
 Finn Halvorsen (born 1947 in Våler, Hedmark) a Norwegian former ski jumper, competed at the 1976 Winter Olympics
 Aage Rundberget (born 1947 in Våler, Hedmark) a Norwegian judge and civil servant

See also 
 Vålerbanen, a motor racing circuit in the municipality.

References

External links

Municipal fact sheet from Statistics Norway 
Municipal website 

 
Municipalities of Innlandet
Populated places on the Glomma River
1854 establishments in Norway